Fergus McNeill is a Scottish author and award-winning interactive entertainment developer. He has designed and created games since the early 1980s, working with companies such as CRL, Silversoft, Macmillan Group, Activision, SCi Eidos and EA. He was a founder member of TIGA and is a member of the Crime Writers' Association and BAFTA. He is the author of a series of contemporary crime thrillers published by Hodder & Stoughton.

Background
McNeill grew up in Scotland, living in Helensburgh and later in Fintry. When he was 11, his family moved to Hampshire, England, where he attended Swanmore Secondary School. Whilst there, he wrote his first games, which attracted coverage in the specialist computer press, and this led to him abandoning college plans in order to pursue a full-time career in the games industry.

Career
McNeill started developing adventure games using The Quill software. Initially, these were sold by mail-order under the Delta 4 brand, before publishing deals with CRL and Silversoft brought the titles to a larger audience. This led to McNeill working with Terry Pratchett to create the first Discworld game and, later on, adapting Murder Off Miami by Dennis Wheatley. After an affiliate label deal with Activision, McNeill set up a new studio for SCi in Southampton, focusing on PC games. While there, he oversaw development on movie tie-ins including The Lawnmower Man, and scripted the award-winning Kingdom O' Magic. He also co-produced (and provided the race announcer's voice-over for) Stainless Software's controversial racing game Carmageddon.

After SCi, he moved to Smoking Gun Productions, where he worked on a range of football management titles and interactive DVD games, before joining InfoSpace / IOMO as studio director in 2005. Two years later, McNeill and other staff from IOMO relaunched the studio as FinBlade. In 2019 he took on the role of game director at Stainless Games.

Books
In 2011, he signed a three-book deal with Hodder & Stoughton.
 Eye Contact (Detective Harland series #1) first published in 2012
 Knife Edge (Detective Harland series #2) first published in 2013
 Cut Out (Detective Harland series #3) first published in 2014
A Detective Harland novella entitled Broken Fall was released in 2015.
A standalone historical thriller, Ashes of America, was published in 2019.
The standalone crime thriller, Up Close And Fatal, was published in 2022.

Games
Early interactive fiction titles and PC CD games
Sherwood Forest - Delta 4
The Dragonstar Trilogy - Delta 4
Quest for the Holy Joystick - Delta 4
Return of the Holy Joystick - Delta 4
Bored of the Rings - Delta 4 / CRL / SilverSoft
Robin of Sherlock - Delta 4 /  CRL / SilverSoft
Galaxias - Delta 4
The Colour of Magic - Delta 4 / Piranha Software
The Boggit - Delta 4 / CRL
The Big Sleaze - Delta 4 / Piranha Software
Murder Off Miami - CRL
Mindfighter - Abstract Concepts /  Activision
The Smirking Horror - Delta 4 / Destiny
The Town with No Name - Delta 4
Psycho Killer - Delta 4
The Lawnmower Man - SCi
Cyberwar - SCi
XS - SCi
Kingdom O' Magic - SCi
Carmageddon (co-producer for SCi)  - Stainless Software / SCi
Robosaurs versus the Space Ba$tards - Smoking Gun Productions
Space Ba$tards: Sudden Justice - Smoking Gun Productions
Club Manager series - Smoking Gun Productions

More recently, McNeill has worked on the following apps:
Battleship - FinBlade /  EA
Battleship for iPad - FinBlade /  EA
Deadliest Catch - FinBlade /  HandsOn
Grooveyard - FinBlade
Movie Quiz - FinBlade
Ninja Ranch - FinBlade / AppyNation
Pictureka! - FinBlade /  EA
Red Bull GP - FinBlade / SSP / Red Bull
The Men Who Stare At Goats - FinBlade / SSP / Momentum Pictures
Tennis Slam - FinBlade
WordSearch - FinBlade
Fry - Virtually Stephen Fry - HeadCastLabs
Puzzler World - Puzzler Media
Link-a-Pix - Puzzler Media
Crosswords - Puzzler Media
Wordsearch - Puzzler Media
Pathfinder - Puzzler Media
Sudoku - Puzzler Media
Puzzle Paradise - Puzzler Media
Puzzler - Puzzler Media
Name Game - Puzzler Media

Awards
Golden Joystick Award (runner up, 1985)
CGR Golden Triad Award (1996)
Sinclair User Classic Award (5 times)
Amtix Accolade Award (1986)
Crash Smash Award (twice)

References

External links
Fergus McNeill website & blog
Eve White (literary agent)
Hodder & Stoughton (publisher)
FinBlade
Graphic adventures by Fergus McNeill

Year of birth missing (living people)
Living people
21st-century British novelists
Scottish crime fiction writers
British video game designers
Interactive fiction writers
People from Helensburgh
Scottish voice directors